Daniel A. Williams (born November 9, 1970) is an American politician who served as a Republican member of the Kansas House of Representatives from 2001 to 2004.

Williams was elected to represent the 14th district in the 2000 election; the race was an open seat as the incumbent, fellow Republican Kay O'Connor, was (successfully) running for the Kansas State Senate. He was re-elected in 2002, and resigned his seat in 2004; Lance Kinzer was appointed to succeed him, and ran unopposed in both the primary and general elections.

References

1970 births
Living people
Republican Party members of the Kansas House of Representatives
Politicians from Olathe, Kansas
21st-century American politicians
20th-century American politicians